Josef Ramírez (1624–1692) was a Spanish painter, active during the Baroque period in his native Valencia.

He was a pupil of Giacinto Gerónimo de Espinosa. He painted in the convent of San Felipe Neri at Valencia. He died in Valencia. He was a learned ecclesiastic, and wrote the Life of St. Philip Neri.

References
Antonio Palomino, An account of the lives and works of the most eminent Spanish painters, sculptors and architects, 1724, first English translation, 1739, p. 122

Pérez Sánchez, Alfonso E. (2000). Jerónimo Jacinto de Espinosa (1600-1667). Valencia: Museo de Bellas Artes, catálogo de la exposición. .

1624 births
1692 deaths
People from Valencia
17th-century Spanish painters
Spanish male painters
Spanish Baroque painters